The Lakhmid dynasty referred to in Arabic as al-Manādhirah or Banu Lakhm was an Arab kingdom in Southern Iraq and Eastern Arabia, with al-Hirah as their capital, from the late 3rd century to 602 CE. They were generally but intermittently the allies and clients of the Sasanian Empire, and participant in the Roman–Persian Wars. While the term "Lakhmids" has also been applied to the ruling dynasty, more recent scholarship prefers to refer to the latter as the Naṣrids.

The Nasrid dynasty authority extended over to their Arab allies in Al-Bahrain and Al-Yamama. When Khosrow II deposed and executed Al-Nu'man III, the last Nasrid ruler, his Arab allies in Najd rose in arms and defeated the Sasanians at the battle of Dhi Qar, which led to the Sasanians losing their control over Eastern Arabia. The victory at Dhi Qar roused confidence and enthusiasm among the Arabs seen as the beginning of a new era. Coupled with increasing instability in Persia proper after the downfall of Khosrow in 628, these events heralded the decisive Battle of Qadisiyya in 636 and the Muslim conquest of Persia.

Nomenclature and problems of Lakhmid history
The nature and identity of the Lakhmid kingdom remains mostly unclear. The ruling Nasrid family emerges with "Amr of the Lakhm", mentioned in the late 3rd-century Paikuli inscription among the vassals of the Sasanian Empire. From this, the term "Lakhmid" has been applied by historians to the Nasrids and their subjects, ruled from al-Hirah. However, as historian Greg Fisher points out, there is "very little information about who made up the people who lived in or around al-Hirah, and there is no reason to suppose that any connection between Nasrid leaders and Lakhm that may have existed in the third century was still present in the sixth, or that the Nasrids ruled over a homogeneous Lakhmid kingdom". This situation is exacerbated by the fact that the historical sources—mostly Byzantine—start dealing with the Lakhmids in greater detail only from the late 5th century, as well as by the relative lack of archaeological work at al-Hirah.

History

The Lakhmid Kingdom was founded and ruled by the Banu Lakhm tribe that emigrated from Yemen in the second century. The founder of the dynasty was 'Amr, whose son Imru' al-Qais (not to be confused with the poet Imru' al-Qais who lived in the sixth century) is claimed to have converted to Christianity. However, there is debate on his religious affinity. Theodor Nöldeke noted that Imru' al-Qays ibn 'Amr was not a Christian, while Irfan Shahîd noted a possible Christian affiliation, suggesting that Imru'al Qays' Christianity may have been "orthodox, heretical or of the Manichaean type". Furthermore, Shahid asserts that the funerary inscription of Imru' al Qays ibn 'Amr lacks Christian formulas and symbols.

Imru' al-Qais dreamt of a unified and independent Arab kingdom and, following that dream, he seized many cities in the Arabian Peninsula. He then formed a large army and developed the Kingdom as a naval power, which consisted of a fleet of ships operating along the Bahraini coast. From this position he attacked the coastal cities of Iran - which at that time was in civil war, due to a dispute as to the succession - even raiding the birthplace of the Sasanian kings, Fars Province.

Imru' al-Qais escaped to Bahrain, taking his dream of a unified Arab nation with him, and then to Syria seeking the promised assistance from Constantius II which never materialized, so he stayed there until he died. When he died he was entombed at al-Nimarah in the Syrian desert.

Imru' al-Qais' funerary inscription is written in an extremely difficult type of script. Recently there has been a revival of interest in the inscription, and controversy has arisen over its precise implications. It is now certain that Imru' al-Qais claimed the title "King of all the Arabs" and also claimed in the inscription to have campaigned successfully over the entire north and centre of the peninsula, as far as the border of Najran.

Two years after his death, in the year 330, a revolt took place where Aws ibn Qallam was killed and succeeded by the son of Imru' al-Qais, 'Amr. Thereafter, the Lakhmids' main rivals were the Ghassanids, who were vassals of the Sasanians' arch-enemy, the Roman Empire. The Lakhmid kingdom could have been a major centre of the Church of the East, which was nurtured by the Sasanians, as it opposed the Chalcedonian Christianity of the Romans.

The Lakhmids remained influential throughout the sixth century. Nevertheless, in 602, the last Lakhmid king, al-Nu'man III ibn al-Mundhir, was put to death by the Sasanian emperor Khosrow II because of a false suspicion of treason, and the Lakhmid kingdom was annexed.

It is now widely believed that the annexation of the Lakhmid kingdom was one of the main factors behind the fall of the Sasanian Empire and the Muslim conquest of Persia as the Sasanians were defeated in the Battle of Hira by Khalid ibn al-Walid.  At that point, the city was abandoned and its materials were used to reconstruct Kufa, its exhausted twin city.

According to the Arab historian Abu ʿUbaidah ( 824), Khosrow II was angry with the king, al-Nu'man III ibn al-Mundhir, for refusing to give him his daughter in marriage, and therefore imprisoned him. Subsequently, Khosrow sent troops to recover the Nu'man family armor, but Hani ibn Mas'ud (Nu'man's friend) refused, and the Arab forces of the Sasanian Empire were defeated at the Battle of Dhi Qar, near al-Hirah, the capital of the Lakhmids, in 609. Hira stood just south of what is now the Iraqi city of Kufa.

Lakhmid dynasty and its descendants

The founder and most of the rulers of the kingdom were from the Banu Lakhm dynasty.

Many modern "Qahtanite" dynasties claim descent from the Lakhmids such as the Mandharis of Oman, Iraq, and the United Arab Emirates, the Na'amanis of Oman, and the Lebanese Druze Arslan royal family.

Lakhmid rulers

Abbadid dynasty
The Abbadid dynasty, which ruled the Taifa of Seville in al-Andalus in the 11th century, was of Lakhmid descent.

In literature

Poets described al-Hira as paradise on earth; an Arab poet described the city's pleasant climate and beauty thus: "One day in al-Hirah is better than a year of treatment".

See also
 Kingdom of Hatra
 Tanukhids
 Christian Arabs
 Zayd ibn Amr

References

Sources
 
 
 
 
 History of the kings of Hirah, in The Fields of Gold by 
 

 
 
 
 

 
States and territories established in the 3rd century
States and territories disestablished in the 7th century
Political families of Lebanon
Sasanian Empire
Ancient Arabic peoples
Tribes of Arabia
Arab dynasties
Barbarian kingdoms
Christian states